Ménil-Hermei is a commune in the Orne department in the Normandy region of north-western France.

Administration

The mayor is Katia Halluin, elected in 2020.

Demography

History

 In 1321, Jean de Corday bought the fief of Mesnil-Hermey.
 In 1465, the title of nobility of Raoul de Corday du Mesnil-Hermé is confirmed.
 In 1505, Marguerite - the daughter of Guillaume "Raoult", Esquire, Lord of Mesnil-Hermey - marries Thomas Williamson, a Scottish knight staying in France with the French king, Charles VIII).
 In the 18th century, the land of Mesnil-Hermey belonged to the Marquis de Rabodanges.

Places of interest

 The valley of the river Orne with:
 the raised stone which bygone people named: "Pierre à Gargantua".
 the rock called "Bec Corbin", dominating the river, at the foot of which passed the old stone road from Domfront to Falaise, via Durcet, La Forêt-Auvray and Ménil-Hermei.

Between these two towns, the road followed (unlike the current asphalt road) the route of the old path of "Bougas". It was by this route that the imposing stone pedestal of the monument to William the Conqueror, erected at the foot of Falaise Castle in 1850, was sent, causing considerable difficulties for the horse teams between "Forest Bridge" and Ménil-Hermei.

See also
 Communes of the Orne department

References

Menilhermei